Flamer could refer to:
Flamer (novel), a 2020 graphic novel by Mike Curato
Flame (malware)
Faggot (slang)
Flaming (Internet)
flamethrower